is a Japanese manga written and illustrated by Kyosuke Usuta. The manga (79 chapters in total) appeared in Weekly Shōnen Jump from 1995 to 1997. In 1998, it was turned into an animation by the Japanese network TBS and ran 48 seven-minute episodes as part of the television show block Wonderful. The anime follows the first 48 chapters of the manga nearly word for word, for the dialogue used in the series and the scenes drawn were lifted directly from the manga panels.

Plot
Wakame High School's extracurricular Sexy Commando Club consists of 5–6 male members including the principal, a female manager, and a small mysterious pet. The strange art of Sexy Commando (which extends back to Japan's Muromachi period) is a martial one; however, instead of focusing on how to defeat an opponent with physical force, the art focuses on how to distract the opponent to the point he is unable to fight. There are many techniques, though the club tends to favor the unzipping of the trousers (Erīze no Yūutsu).

Characters

Before finding the Sexy Commando guide book and venturing on a hermit-like three month vacation from school, Masaru was a new transfer student to Wakame High. After enrolling, he joined and defeated all members of all martial arts clubs in the school (Karate, Judo, etc.) He has tremendous strength, and a tremendous lack of common sense and understanding of social skills to go with it. He created the Sexy Commando Club after the Karate Club lost all of its members and therefore faced cancellation. He almost always wears blue jeans, a long-sleeved T-shirt, and two golden, metallic rings on his shoulders that he "found" (the rings certainly seem to be extraterrestrial, because Masaru assaulted two aliens that came to reclaim them). The rings also create instantaneous hair growth and interfere with electronic displays (one cash register displayed "Help me" and an electronic scale displayed "Lardbutt" when the rings were near). He loves mustaches, giving strange nicknames, and drawing on the faces of those he has defeated with permanent marker; he often writes the character 肉 (niku, meat) on the foreheads of defeated opponents (this is one of several references in the show to the long-running manga Kinnikuman). He is the club's chief and created the club's song, rules, and symbol mark. In his childhood, Masaru labelled himself as a "Shōjo Commando" but after his father's efforts to change his son, Masaru decided to abandon that title.

Nicknamed , is a very normal transfer student to Wakame High School, and is somewhat of a narrator of the story. He also provides the tsukkomi to Masaru's boke. A bit short and weak looking, he unwittingly becomes Masaru's friend and a club member. He adores cats.

Nicknamed , is the tall, blond former chief of the Karate Club. Once Masaru joins the club and defeats all the club members, all students involved in the club quit and Machahiko must recruit new members before the club is disbanded by the school. Masaru then offers to help, and the club is saved, but the name of the club is then changed to the Sexy Commando Club. Machahiko can be instantly encouraged or discouraged by mentioning that what he does is either "manly" or not.

Nicknamed , he has hair dyed brown and is a completely emaciated bag of bones, in part due to his addiction to vitamin supplements. He joins the club in order to become stronger, and for a brief period does become stronger, giving up the vitamins for food and exercise. Unfortunately, his reliance on vitamin supplements continues, and every time he takes them, so does his spasmatic cry "Okure-nisan" (a reference to Japanese comedian Mr. Okure, who is also extremely thin). He was also the ace of his baseball team in middle school.

Nicknamed , he joins later in the story, and is a semi-minor character. After begging Masaru to make him more "individualistic", Masaru gives this model nerd a perm, and then names him "Afro-kun". An opposing Sexy Commando team member later rips two holes from the afro and his hair assumes a more triangular shape. He is extremely smart, but has no sense with girls.

Nicknamed , he is actually a former Sexy Mate (Sexy Commando participant) who won the All-Japan Sexy Commando Tournament six years straight. He was formerly a teacher and now is the principal of the school. He suddenly aged when he expended all of his energy pushing the school four inches (101.600 mm) off its foundation in order to inspire a lazy student (who later became Prime Minister). He dons a red ski mask when he wishes to become Susan (and hide his identity to Masaru).

Nicknamed , she joined the group initially believing that the club was actually the "Mustache Club". She shares Masaru's love for facial hair, as her father died trying to grow the "legendary blue mustache". She is always supportive of the others in the club. She also spends a considerable amount of time with Meso.

Nicknamed , he is an annoying P.E. coach that sponsors the Sexy Commando Club. He always wears training pants (thus the nickname Torepan), wears aviator sunglasses, and is always tweeting away at a coach's whistle. He one time bets the club's endowment money on a baseball game (Sexy Commando Club vs. Baseball Club) that the Sexy Command Club subsequently wins. The club members pay no attention to him, and consider him a nuisance.
 

It is questionable what Meso is, because even though the cute, little yellow munchkin with a blue mustache for eyebrows is the mascot of the team, its zipper (located on his back) has opened various times and various other lifeforms have emerged from inside (the anime's finale has Maetel from Galaxy Express 999 come out). Meso's usual comment is "Mokyu". It has been known to be extremely violent when threatened, and has an impressive set of fangs and claws. It was found on either a spaceship or in a coffee shop called Dosukoi Kissa Je T'aime, depending on the club members' opinions.

Reception
It is considered a hit in Japan; its seven volumes have sold over 7 million copies. In a 2008 Oricon survey with 900 men and women from 10 to 40 years, Sexy Commando Gaiden was the third most fun manga; among people of 20–29 it was the most voted. In a 2017 readers' poll on goo, the series ranked ninth in the top 50 gag anime. Jonathan Bethune, in Publishers Weekly said, "Usuta's writing consistently avoids the obvious gags found in typical shonen comedy and instead challenges readers with its clever satire and wit." Commenting on the anime adaptation, Justin Sevakis of Anime News Network called the series Akitaro Daichi's magnum opus in terms of "ridiculous, spastic comedy."

References

External links 
 

1995 manga
1998 anime television series debuts
Anime series based on manga
Comedy anime and manga
Magic Bus (studio)
Shōnen manga
Shueisha manga
TBS Television (Japan) original programming
Wonderful (TV programming block)